Sky Travel and Aviation is a privately owned airline in South Sudan that was founded and began operating in 2019. It commenced operations on 19 October 2019 when it launched its maiden flight from Juba International Airport in South Sudan to Gulu Airport in neighboring Uganda.

Location
The airline maintains its headquarters in the city of Juba, the capital of South Sudan.

History
In October, Sky Aviation and Travel began twice-weekly flights between Juba International Airport and Gulu Airport in Uganda. It is expected that as traffic picks up on this route, new service will be established between Gulu Airport and Entebbe International Airport, Uganda's largest civilian and military airport.

Destinations
As of October 2019, Sky Travel and Aviation maintained regular services to the following destinations:
South Sudan
Juba: Juba International Airport (main hub)
Uganda
Gulu: Gulu Airport

Fleet
The Sky Travel and Aviation fleet consists of the following aircraft as of October 2019.

See also

 List of airlines of South Sudan

References

External links
 South Sudan Airline Launches Flights To Gulu As of 21 October 2019.

Airlines of South Sudan
Airlines established in 2019
2019 establishments in South Sudan
Companies based in Juba
Low-cost carriers